Deh-e Abbas (also Romanized as Deh-e ‘Abbās and Deh ‘Abbās; also known as Da Abbas) is a village in Gavrud Rural District, in the Central District of Sonqor County, Kermanshah Province, Iran. At the 2006 census, its population was 169, in 31 families.

References 

Populated places in Sonqor County